Harold Hunter Foundation (HHF) is a nonprofit organization founded in 2007 in honor of professional skateboarder Harold Hunter and dedicated to improving the skateboarding community of New York City and beyond by supporting and promoting access to skateboarding for underserved youth.

History

Founding 
The Harold Hunter Foundation started organically by friends and family who believed there should be a foundation to honor Hunter's life and spirit. Jessica Forsyth, whose sister was best friends with Harold, and her family helped spearhead the founding of the organization alongside Harold's brother Ronald and friend Jefferson Pang.

Programs

Skate Camp Scholarship Program 
Beginning in 2007, the Harold Hunter Foundation set out to offer scholarships to inner city kids to go to Woodward Camp. Hunter loved camp Woodward when he went, not as a camper, but as a visiting am and pro. By developing a Woodward scholarships program, the HHF set out to extend this opportunity to go to skateboarding camp to underserved youth who might not otherwise have the chance. Since the beginning of the program, the HHF has expanded its scholarships to other skate camps; granting more than 200 need-based scholarships for NYC youth to attend skate camps including: Camp Woodward, the Element YMCA Skate Camp, and the Homage Skateboard Academy.

Harold Hunter Day 
Ever year, the Harold Hunter Foundation hosts an annual skate jam honoring the life of Harold Hunter.

Education Initiatives 
The HHF programming has expanded beyond offering skate camp scholarships. The HHF now provides a spectrum of community programming and educational experiences geared towards underserved communities.

Panels - HHF in the Classroom 
HHF brings skateboarding professionals including Chad Muska, Luis Tolentino, Rodney Smith, Steve Rodriguez, and others into classroom settings to speak to a range of audiences from school assemblies to selected mentee groups of talented skaters to students with behavioral issues.

KICKFLIP Digital Media Training Program 
The Kickflip Digital Media training program is a HHF initiative with an aim to train hard to teach youth digital media skills.

International Service Skate Trips 
The Harold Hunter Foundation takes international service skate trips, bringing underprivileged American youth around the world to skate and do skate activism.

Merchandise collaborations 
The Harold Hunter Foundation has collaborated with a spectrum of brands including HUF, Adidas, Zoo York, Nike, and others to make merchandise commemorating Harold Hunter with proceeds going to the foundation.

References 

Skateboarding
Skateboarding organizations
Organizations based in New York City
Non-profit organizations based in New York City
Social welfare charities based in the United States
Sports charities
Sports foundations based in the United States